Bled White may refer to:

 Bled White (song), a song by Elliott Smith
 Bled White (film), a 2011 zombie horror film